Ramenye is a rural locality (a village) in Pertsevskoye Rural Settlement, Gryazovetsky District, Vologda Oblast, Russia. The population was 15 as of 2002.

Geography 
Ramenye is located 42 km southeast of Gryazovets (the district's administrative centre) by road. Levino is the nearest locality.

References 

Rural localities in Gryazovetsky District